The men's singles of the 2019 Advantage Cars Prague Open tournament was played on clay in Prague, Czech Republic.

Lukáš Rosol was the defending champion but lost in the quarterfinals to Carlos Taberner.

Mario Vilella Martínez won the title after defeating Tseng Chun-hsin 6–4, 6–2 in the final.

Seeds
All seeds receive a bye into the second round.

Draw

Finals

Top half

Section 1

Section 2

Bottom half

Section 3

Section 4

References

External links
Main draw
Qualifying draw

2019 ATP Challenger Tour
2019 Men's Singles